is a prefectural museum in Nagaoka, Japan, dedicated to the history of Niigata Prefecture. The museum opened in 2000.

See also
 Echigo Province
 Sado Province
 List of Historic Sites of Japan (Niigata)

References

External links
 Niigata Prefectural Museum of History
  Niigata Prefectural Museum of History

Museums in Niigata Prefecture
Buildings and structures in Nagaoka, Niigata
History museums in Japan
Prefectural museums
Museums established in 2000
2000 establishments in Japan